The 2022 Heilbronner Neckarcup was a professional tennis tournament played on clay courts. It was the eighth edition of the tournament which was part of the 2022 ATP Challenger Tour. It took place in Heilbronn, Germany between 9 and 14 May 2022.

Champions

Singles

 Daniel Altmaier def.  Andrej Martin 3–6, 6–1, 6–4.

Doubles

 Nicolás Barrientos /  Miguel Ángel Reyes-Varela def.  Jelle Sels /  Bart Stevens 7–5, 6–3.

Singles main-draw entrants

Seeds

 1 Rankings are as of 2 May 2022.

Other entrants
The following players received wildcards into the singles main draw:
  Marius Copil
  Max Hans Rehberg
  Bernabé Zapata Miralles

The following players received entry into the singles main draw as alternates:
  Nicola Kuhn
  Alexander Ritschard
  Jelle Sels

The following players received entry from the qualifying draw:
  Jonáš Forejtek
  Benjamin Hassan
  Oleksii Krutykh
  Rudolf Molleker
  Sumit Nagal
  Henri Squire

The following player received entry as a lucky loser:
  Miljan Zekić

References

2022 ATP Challenger Tour
2022
2022 in German tennis
May 2022 sports events in Germany